The Girl in the Crowd is a 1935 British comedy film directed by Michael Powell starring Barry Clifton, Patricia Hilliard, and Googie Withers.

The film has been declared "Missing, Believed Lost" by the British Film Institute.

Plot
The wife of a bookseller gives advice about picking up women to her husband's friend (whom she has never met) over the phone. She advises him simply to follow the first pretty woman he sees. Unfortunately, when he takes her advice, she is the girl in the crowd he ends up following, leading to his arrest.

Cast
 Barry Clifton as David Gordon
 Patricia Hilliard as Marian
 Googie Withers as Sally. Withers was just an extra, until the second female lead quit and she took over.
 Harold French as Bob
 Clarence Blakiston as Mr. Peabody
 Margaret Gunn as Joyce
 Richard Littledale as Bill Manners
 Phyllis Morris as Mrs.Lewis
 Patric Knowles as Tom Burrows
 Marjorie Corbett as Secretary
 Brenda Lawless as Policewoman
 Barbara Waring as Mannequin
 Eve Lister as Ruby
 Betty Lyne as Phyllis
 Melita Bell as Assistant Manageress
 John Wood as Harry

References

Notes

Bibliography

 Chibnal, Steve. Quota Quickies : The Birth of the British 'B' Film. London: BFI, 2007. 
 Powell, Michael. A Life in Movies: An Autobiography. London: Heinemann, 1986. .

External links
 
 
 The Girl in the Crowd reviews and articles at the Powell & Pressburger Pages

1935 films
1930s English-language films
British comedy films
1935 comedy films
Films directed by Michael Powell
Films by Powell and Pressburger
Lost British films
British black-and-white films
1935 lost films
1930s British films